Washington House Bill 2661 is a Washington state law which bans employment, insurance and housing discrimination against LGBT individuals, passed by the Washington State Legislature on January 27, 2006, and signed into law by Governor Christine Gregoire four days later. The bill went into effect on June 8, 2006.

Summary
Expands the jurisdiction of the human rights commission to include sexual orientation and gender expression or identity as a basis for prohibiting discrimination.
Adds definitions for sexual orientation and gender expression or identity to Washington's Law Against Discrimination.
Exempts from Washington's Law Against Discrimination those real estate transactions that include the sharing, rental, or sublease of a dwelling unit when the dwelling unit is to be occupied by the owner or sublessor.

See also
 Equal Rights Washington - key organization that pushed for its passage
 List of US ballot initiatives to repeal LGBT anti-discrimination laws

References

External links
Washington State House Bill 2661 as passed legislature (PDF)
Legislative History of Washington State House Bill 2661
Washington State House Bill 2661 Fiscal Notes

LGBT law in the United States
LGBT rights in the United States
Washington (state) statutes
2006 in LGBT history

LGBT in Washington (state)
2006 in American law
2006 in Washington (state)